St. John's West was a federal electoral district in Newfoundland and Labrador, Canada, that was represented in the House of Commons of Canada from 1949 to 2004.

This riding was created in 1949 when Newfoundland joined the Canadian Confederation.

It was abolished in 2003 when it was redistributed into Avalon and St. John's South—Mount Pearl ridings.

It initially consisted of the Districts of Placentia-St. Mary's and Ferryland and a part of St. John's. In 1952, it was redefined to include also the Iona Islands in the District of Placentia West. In 1966, it was redefined to consist of the provincial districts of St. John's South, Ferryland, St. Mary's and Placentia East, and those parts of the provincial districts of St. John's West, St. John's North and St. John's Centre not included in the electoral district of St. John's East.

Members of Parliament

This riding elected the following Members of Parliament:

Election results

See also 

 List of Canadian federal electoral districts
 Past Canadian electoral districts

External links 
 Riding history for St. John's West (1949–1952) from the Library of Parliament
 Riding history for St. John's West (1952–1987) from the Library of Parliament
 Riding history for St. John's West (1987–2003) from the Library of Parliament

Former federal electoral districts of Newfoundland and Labrador